This is a collection of scientific, public opinion polls that have been conducted relating to the 2012 Russian presidential election.

Election forecasts

Open survey

According to a "Levada Center" opinion poll from September 2011, 41% of Russian people wanted to see Putin be a candidate in the 2012 elections as opposed to 22% for Medvedev, while 10% wanted someone else and 28% were unsure.

Exit polls

References

2012 Russian presidential election
Presidential
Russia